Trogloarctus trionyches is a species of tardigrade. It is the only species in the genus Trogloarctus, which is part of the family Coronarctidae. The species are found in the Mediterranean Sea. They were first found in 1996 in an underwater cave near La Ciotat in the Bouches-du-Rhône department, southern France.

Etymology

The genus name Trogloarctus is a combination of the Greek words troglodytes ("cave dweller") and arktos ("bear"). The specific name trionyches is also Greek: tria ("three") and onych- ("claw").

References

Coronarctidae
Fauna of the Mediterranean Sea
Animals described in 1996